Simms Stream is a  river in northern New Hampshire in the United States. It is a tributary of the Connecticut River, which flows south to Long Island Sound, an arm of the Atlantic Ocean.

Simms Stream is located entirely in the town of Columbia, New Hampshire. It rises near Gadwah Notch in the eastern part of Columbia and flows northwest through logging and farming country to the Connecticut River near the border between Columbia and Colebrook.

See also 

 List of New Hampshire rivers

References

Rivers of New Hampshire
Tributaries of the Connecticut River
Rivers of Coös County, New Hampshire